Terror of the Steppes (also known as The Mighty Khan) is a 1964 Italian adventure film written and directed  by Tanio Boccia and starring Kirk Morris.

Plot

Cast 
 Kirk Morris as Sandar Khan
 Moira Orfei as  Malina
 Daniele Vargas as  Altan Khan
 Ombretta Colli as Samira
  Peter White as  Yessen Khan
 Giulio Donnini  as   Khan's Consouler
 Ugo Sasso  as  Ciukhai
 Attilio Dottesio  as Commander of the Guards
 Furio Meniconi  as  Kublaï

References

External links

Italian adventure films
1964 adventure films
Films directed by Tanio Boccia
Films scored by Carlo Rustichelli
Films set in Asia
1960s Italian-language films
1960s Italian films